Cyprus competed at the 1992 Summer Paralympics in Barcelona, Spain. 4 competitors from Cyprus won no medals and so did not place in the medal table.

See also 
 Cyprus at the Paralympics
 Cyprus at the 1992 Summer Olympics

References 

Cyprus at the Paralympics
Nations at the 1992 Summer Paralympics
1992 in Cypriot sport